Brant Pinvidic is a Canadian film director and television producer, best known for Why I'm Not on Facebook, Why I'm Not on Pokemon GO, Bar Rescue and Extreme Weight Loss. He is the CEO of INvelop Entertainment, host of the podcast Why I'm Not... With Brant Pinvidic, based on the film series of the same name, and a contributing writer for Forbes.

Early life and education 
He attended Spectrum Community School in Victoria, British Columbia.

Career

Directing and producing 
Pinvidic began his career producing television series and made-for-television movies, beginning in 2005. He first served as Senior Vice President of Development at GRB Entertainment, followed by Senior Vice President of Programming and Development for TLC, and then served as President and Chief Creative Officer of Eyeworks (formerly 3 Ball Entertainment) for six years. Pinvidic is the CEO of INvelop Entertainment, a multimedia production company specializing in unscripted and non-fiction programming, which he founded in January 2016. The company entered into a multi-year production deal with STX Entertainment in 2016.

His debut feature film Why I'm Not on Facebook premiered at Woodstock Film Festival in 2014. Pinvidic wrote, produced, and directed the film, which explored the cultural phenomenon of Facebook. It features interviews with both everyday users and public figures, including Dr. Drew Pinsky, Roseanne Barr, Cameron Winklevoss, and Tyler Winklevoss. The film won an award at the Manhattan Film Festival in 2015 and screened at the San Francisco Documentary Film Festival. In 2016, FilmRise acquired home media rights from Gravitas Ventures for the film.

In 2016, Pinvidic produced, directed, and starred in the short film Why I'm Not On Pokémon Go, which received over 1 million views on YouTube. In the film, Pinvidic explores the popular game Pokémon Go by interviewing over 100 people, including family members, die-hard Pokémon trainers, and public figures. He made the film with the intent of creating a stronger connection with his daughter. The film was featured as a parenting tool in LA Parent Magazine and won multiple awards, including Best Documentary Short at the Hollywood Boulevard Film Festival, Best Documentary Short Film at the Move Me Productions Film Festival, the Silver Award at the Spotlight Short Film Awards, and an Award of Recognition at Hollywood International Moving Pictures Film Festival. It also screened at the Silicon Valley International Film Festival, the Creation International Film Festival, and the Miami International Film Festival.

In April 2017, Pinvidic expanded the Why I'm Not... concept into an audio and video podcast, Why I'm Not... With Brant Pinvidic, in collaboration with producer Maria Menunous. The podcast explores topics, fads, trends, and addictions from an outsider's perspective in which Pinvidic interviews guest experts on each topic. Guests have included Ben Shapiro, Jason Ellis, Spencer Pratt, Heidi Pratt, Mick Foley, Freddie Wong, Matthew Santoro, Todd Marinovich, Eric Benét, and Hope Solo. The podcast is produced at Afterbuzz TV Studios and distributed by IHeartRadio, iTunes, and PodcastOne.

Professional speaking 
Pinvidic has spoken professionally at multiple conferences, panels, and summits in the media and investment industry, including The West Coast Documentary and Reality Conference in 2012; Realscreen Summit annually from 2014 to 2017; at the Paramount Pictures Produced By LA conference, hosted by the Directors Guild of America, in Los Angeles in 2015; at the Making Better Presentations To Sophisticated Audiences at the Noble Capital Markets Conference in Florida, which streamed online internationally, in 2015 and 2016; at the National Association of Broadcasters Show with producer Ben Silverman in 2016; at the C-Suite Investor Summit at How Media Is Leveling The Playing Field in 2017; and at the Digital Hollywood Experience in 2017.

In 2015, Pinvidic was listed on The Hollywood Reporter's 30 Most Powerful Reality Players of 2015 list.

In 2017, he again spoke at the National Association of Broadcasters Media Finance and Investor Conference in Las Vegas where he was interviewed by Larry King, along with Jon Taffer and Rick Harrison, in a session called Celebrity Executive Officers: How These CEOS Manage Reality.

That same year, he became a contributing writer for Forbes magazine. He contributed multiple articles to the business magazine about being an entrepreneur "in Hollywood and beyond". His first article, titled The 3-Minute Rule: What A Hollywood Producer Can Teach You About Pitching Your Business, received over 100,000 views and is based on his upcoming book. His second article, titled I Just Lost My Company's Biggest Deal. Now What?, was selected as an editor's pick. He also wrote the articles Don't Make Your Employees Your Emotional Partners: You'll Regret It and 3 Keys to Choosing the Right Side Hustle.

Filmography

Film

Television

Awards and nominations 
In 2015, Pinvidic's film Why I'm Not on Facebook won a Manhattan Film Festival Award.

In 2016, his film Why I'm Not on Pokémon Go won multiple awards, including Best Documentary Short at the Hollywood Boulevard Film Festival, Best Documentary Short Film at the Move Me Productions Film Festival, the Silver Award at the Spotlight Short Film Awards, and an Award of Recognition at Hollywood International Moving Pictures Film Festival.

References

External links 
 INvelop Entertainment Official Site
 

Year of birth missing (living people)
Living people
American film producers
American film directors
American television producers
Film producers from British Columbia
Canadian television producers
University of Victoria alumni